Among Gnomes and Trolls, is a popular Swedish folklore and fairy tales annual and children's fairy tale anthology published since 1907. One of the most noted of the early illustrators is artist John Bauer.

Writers and illustrators 

Founded in 1907, and continuing to this very day, several of the foremost Swedish authors and illustrators have worked for the annual.

The first four volumes were illustrated by John Bauer. Volume 5 (1911) was illustrated by Norwegian illustrator Louis Moe, after which Bauer resumed illustrating from 1912 to 1915 (volumes 6-9). 1916 had no issue, but the series continues in 1917, illustrated by Gustaf Tenggren and Aina Masolle, who was the series' first woman illustrator. From 1918 to 1926 Gustaf Tenggren was the sole illustrator. Between 1927 and 1980, Einar Norelius was the chief illustrator. He was succeeded by Hans Arnold. Among the writers were authors such as Hjalmar Bergman, Helena Nyblom, Margareta Ekström, Gösta Knutsson and Edith Unnerstad.

Several books with extracts from the original volumes illustrated by John Bauer have been published. The first one was published in 1931 to raise money for a memorial honouring Bauer.

One of the most noted pictures from "Among gnomes and trolls" by John Bauer 1913 is Ännu sitter Tuvstarr kvar och ser ner i vattnet ("Still, Tuvstarr sits and gazes down into the water").

List of tales 
Complete list of the tales in the series, 1907–1910 and 1912–1915, illustrated by John Bauer as well as the tales in the 1911 volume illustrated by Louis Moe.

1907 
En inledningsdikt, ("An introductory poem")
Daniel Fallström

Sagan om Dag och Daga och flygtrollet på Skyberget, ("The story of Dag and Daga and the flying troll on Skyberget")
Harald Östenson

Den förtrollade skogen, ("The Enchanted Forest")
Anna Wahlenberg

Lyckoblomman på Solberga klint, ("Lucky flower on Solberga klint")
Alfred Smedberg

Njunje Paggas äventyr, ("The Adventures of Njunje Pagga")
P.A. Lindholm

Tomtens julafton, ("Santa's Christmas Eve")
Gurli Hertzman-Ericson

Pojken som spände trollet för kälken, ("The boy who strapped the troll to the sled")
Harald Östenson

Han som kunde rida i alla väder, ("He who could ride in all weathers")
Helena Nyblom

1908 

Svanhamnen ("The Swan maiden"),
Helena Nyblom

Skinnpåsen,
Anna Wahlenberg

Konungens bägare,
Sophie Linge

Sagan om fiskaren Sikur och trollnätet,
Cyrus Granér

Den mäktige i det krossande berget,
Harald Östenson

1909 

Herr Birre och trollen,
Vilhälm Nordin

Sagan om de fyra stortrollen och lille Vill-Vallareman, ("The story of the four big trolls and little Vill-Vallareman")
Cyrus Granér

Trollen och tomtepojken ("The trolls and the gnome boy"),
Alfred Smedberg

Tomtarna,
Anna Wahlenberg

Skogsväktarne,
Jeanna Oterdahl

1910 

Agneta och sjökungen,
Helena Nyblom

Prinsen utan skugga,
Jeanna Oterdahl

Svartjätten och den heliga ljusastaken,
Ester Edquist

Pojken som gick till vindarnas håla,
Alfred Smedberg

Trollritten,
av Anna Wahlenberg

Pojken och tomtemössan,
Vilhälm Nordin

1911 
Den Fiffige tomten vid Alleberg,
Alfred Smedberg

Trasnidaren, 
Jeanna Otterdahl

 Brummel-Bas i Berget,
Gurli Hertzman-Ericson

Molnbrollopet,
Vilhalm Nordin

Skönheten och odjuret,
Helena Nyblom

1912 

Oskuldens vandring,
Helena Nyblom

Trollkarlens kappa,
Anna Wahlenberg

Trollsonen som hade solögon och vart skogsman,
Vilhälm Nordin

Vingas krans,
Ellen Lundberg-Nyblom

Pojken som aldrig var rädd ("The boy who was never afraid"),
Alfred Smedberg

1913 

Broder Martin, ("Brother Martin")
Emil Eliason

Bortbytingarna ("The Changeling"),
Helena Nyblom

Sagan om äldtjuren Skutt och lilla prinsessan Tuvstarr, ("The story of the old bull Skutt and the little princess Tuvstarr")
Helge Kjellin

Kvastarnas kvast, alla kvastars kung,
Vilhälm Nordin

1914 

Ringen ("The ring"),
Helena Nyblom

När trollmor skötte kungens storbyk ("When Mother Troll did the laundry for the king"),
Elsa Beskow, illustrated by John Bauer

Drottningens halsband ("The queens necklace"),
Anna Wahlenberg

Fågel Fenix vingpenna,
Jeanna Oterdahl

1915 

En riddare red fram,
Jeanna Oterdahl

Pojken och trollen eller Äventyret ("The boy and the trolls or The Adventure"),
Walter Stenström

Spelmannen som fick madonnans guldsko,
Emil Linders

Guldnycklarna, ("The golden keys")
W.E. Björk

Illustrated English Translation 

Many of the tales, and many of the illustrations appeared in An Illustrated Treasury of Swedish Folk Tales and Fairy Tales.

References 

1907 books
Illustration
Western art
Series of children's books
Collections of fairy tales
Annual magazines
Fantasy anthology series
Swedish fairy tales
Literary magazines published in Sweden
1907 establishments in Sweden
Swedish folklore
Legendary creatures in popular culture
Trolls in popular culture
Youth in Sweden
20th century in Sweden
21st century in Sweden
Series of books